The Bite in the Apple: A Memoir of My Life with Steve Jobs is a 2013 book by Chrisann Brennan. She is an American painter, Steve Jobs's high school girlfriend, an early employee of Apple Inc. before it went public, and the mother of Jobs's first child, Lisa Brennan-Jobs. It was released on October 29, 2013.

See also
List of books and publications related to the hippie subculture

References

External links

The Bite in the Apple - St. Martin's Press

Interviews and presentations
Chrisann Brennan: A Memoir of My Life with Steve Jobs - 2014 video clip from the series, "Talks at Google".
Chrisann Brennan on Steve Jobs - Video interview on Anderson Cooper 360°, November 12, 2013.
Chrisann Brennan on Her Life with Steve Jobs - Radio interview on The Leonard Lopate Show, October 29, 2013.

Books about Steve Jobs
American memoirs
St. Martin's Press books
2013 non-fiction books